Cathedral Park is a neighborhood in Portland, Oregon. It is situated on the North Portland peninsula and lies on the east shore of the Willamette River. The neighborhood is named after Cathedral Park, which is located under the St. Johns Bridge, and was given its name due to the Gothic arches that support the bridge, which resemble a cathedral arch.

History
The St. Johns Bridge connects the neighborhood to the Linnton and Northwest Industrial neighborhoods in Northwest Portland across the Willamette River.  In addition to these neighborhoods, Cathedral Park is bordered by St. Johns to the northeast and University Park to the southeast.

The 1911 Sanborn Map Index for the City of St. Johns, Oregon, shows that the Cathedral Park neighborhood was part of the original City of St. Johns prior to annexation by Portland in 1915.

The neighborhood is named after its most prominent landmark, the city park also called Cathedral Park, which in turn is named after the cathedral-like columns of the St. Johns Bridge it surrounds.

See also
 Burlington Northern Railroad Bridge 5.1

References

External links
 
 North Portland Walking Map
Cathedral Park Street Tree Inventory Report

 
Neighborhoods in Portland, Oregon